Judith L Burne (born 1962), is a female former rower who competed for Great Britain and England.

Rowing career
Burne represented Great Britain in three World Championships. She represented England and won a gold medal in the lightweight coxless four, at the 1986 Commonwealth Games in Edinburgh, Scotland.

References

1962 births
English female rowers
Commonwealth Games medallists in rowing
Commonwealth Games gold medallists for England
Rowers at the 1986 Commonwealth Games
Living people
Medallists at the 1986 Commonwealth Games